Josep Maria Sert i Badia (Barcelona, 21 December 1874 – 27 November 1945, buried in the Vic Cathedral) was a Spanish muralist, the son of an affluent textile industry family, and friend of Salvador Dalí. He was particularly known for his grisaille style, often in gold and black.

Career
Sert initially studied art in Rome before moving to Paris in 1899. There, he became involved with a group of decorative artists known as Les Nabis, gravitating around Paul Ranson, who had studied at the private Académie Julian, founded in 1868 by painter Rodolphe Julian.

Sert was commissioned in 1900 to paint the interior of the Vic Cathedral in the Province of Barcelona, Catalonia in murals, which took him more than 30 years to complete.

By 1910, Sert had begun fully focusing on murals and other large-scale work. He collaborated with Russian Sergei Diaghilev to create sets for his Ballets Russes. In 1929 he was commissioned with the elaboration of a series of large forma canvases painted in his signature grisaille style intending to cover the walls of the reconverted San Telmo church in Donostia-San Sebastián; they portray different historic chapters of the Basques in an epic manner.

In the United States, Sert painted a mural at the Waldorf-Astoria in New York City, as well as   a 1937 mural entitled American Progress at 30 Rockefeller Center. American Progress was commissioned by the Rockefellers to replace Diego Rivera’s mural Man at the Crossroads, which Nelson Rockefeller destroyed because it included an image of Lenin. He later painted the walls and ceilings of the Council Chambers at the League of Nations in Geneva.

Personal life
Sert began an affair with the well-known pianist and patron of the arts Misia Godebska in 1908. They married on 2 September 1920. In 1925, Sert met Georgian-Russian sculptress Isabelle Roussadana Mdivani, known as Roussy, who subsequently moved in with him and Misia. Sert began an affair with Roussy and later divorced Misia on 28 December 1927 to marry Mdivani.

Roussy and Sert were married in 1928 in a civil ceremony at the consulate in The Hague. In 1930, they were married in a religious ceremony at the Spanish church in Paris.

After Roussy died in 1938, Sert reconciled with Misia and returned to life with her, though they kept separate apartments

Sert died on 27 November 1945 in Barcelona, and left his apartment and furnishings to Misia.

Gallery

References

External links
 See the murals at the Rockefeller Center in New York City.

1874 births
1945 deaths
20th-century Spanish painters
20th-century Spanish male artists
Spanish male painters
Académie Julian alumni
Muralists
People from Barcelona
Spanish artists